Chal Chuq (also Romanized as Chāl Chūq) is a village in Abharrud Rural District, in the Central District of Abhar County, Zanjan Province, Iran. At the 2006 census, its population was 137, in 24 families.

References 

Populated places in Abhar County